Gary Sice (born 8 November 1984) is a Gaelic footballer who plays for his local club, Corofin, and, formerly, at senior level for the Galway county team from 2007 until 2017.

Sice was a key member of the St Jarlath's College team that won the Hogan Cup in 2002 beating St Michael's College, Enniskillen on a scoreline of 3-13 to 0-6 along with Michael Meehan, Niall Coleman, Darren Mullahy, Alan Burke whom he also lined out with for Galway in later years and James Kavanagh, who also lined out for both Kildare and Galway.

The then Galway manager Kevin Walsh confirmed Sice's retirement from the inter-county scene on 8 January 2018, after a postponed FBD Insurance League game against Mayo due to have taken place at MacHale Park.

After briefly returning in 2020, Sice had left the Galway panel by 2021.

His wife, Bevin Sice (née Grant, from Piltown in County Kilkenny) died in 2022, following an illness.

Honours
St Jarlath's College
Hogan Cup (1): 2002

Corofin
Galway Senior Football Championship (9): 2006, 2008, 2009, 2011, 2013, 2014, 2015, 2016, 2017
Connacht Senior Club Football Championship (5): 2008, 2009, 2014, 2016, 2017

Galway
Connacht Under-21 Football Championship (1): 2005
All-Ireland Under-21 Football Championship (1): 2005
Connacht Senior Football Championship (2): 2008, 2016

References

1984 births
Living people
Corofin Gaelic footballers
Galway inter-county Gaelic footballers